Ellesmere Port and Neston is a constituency represented in the House of Commons of the UK Parliament since 2015 by Justin Madders of the Labour Party.

History 
The constituency was formed in 1983, largely from the southern parts of the former Bebington and Ellesmere Port and Wirral constituencies.  Both were former Conservative seats.  Mike Woodcock of the Conservatives held the seat from the 1983 election until the 1992 election, when it was taken by Andrew Miller of the Labour Party.  Miller held the seat until his retirement from the Commons in 2015, during which time it became a relatively safe Labour seat, and was succeeded by Justin Madders.

Boundaries 

1983–1997: The Borough of Ellesmere Port and Neston, and the City of Chester wards of Elton, Mollington, and Saughall.

The majority of the constituency (Ellesmere Port) had previously been one half of the abolished Bebington and Ellesmere Port constituency, whilst Neston had been a smaller part of the abolished Wirral constituency. The three City of Chester wards were transferred from the City of Chester constituency.

1997–2010: The Borough of Ellesmere Port and Neston, and the City of Chester ward of Elton.

The Mollington and Saughall wards transferred back to City of Chester.

2010–2019: The Parliamentary Constituencies (England) Order 2007 defined the boundaries as:

The Borough of Ellesmere Port and Neston (all wards), and the City of Chester wards of Elton and Mickle Trafford.

Minor changes due to revision of ward boundaries.

However, before the new boundaries came into force for the 2010 election, the districts making up the county of Cheshire were abolished on 1 April 2009, being replaced by four unitary authorities. Consequently, the constituency's boundaries became:

The Cheshire West and Chester wards of Chester Villages (part), Ellesmere Port Town, Elton, Grange, Ledsham and Manor, Little Neston and Burton (part), Neston, Netherpool, Parkgate, Rossmore, St Paul's, Strawberry, Sutton, Whitby, and Willaston and Thornton.

2019–present: Following a further local government ward boundary review in 2019, the boundaries are currently:

The Cheshire West and Chester wards of Central and Grange, Gowy Rural (part), Ledsham and Manor, Little Neston, Neston, Netherpool, Parkgate, Sandstone (part), Strawberry, Sutton Villages, Westminster, Whitby Groves, Whitby Park, Willaston and Thornton (part), and Wolverham.

The constituency includes the industrial town of Ellesmere Port, the smaller residential town of Neston and villages such as Burton, Parkgate, Willaston, Elton and Mickle Trafford.

Members of Parliament

Elections

Elections in the 2010s

Elections in the 2000s

Elections in the 1990s

Elections in the 1980s

See also 

 List of parliamentary constituencies in Cheshire
History of parliamentary constituencies and boundaries in Cheshire
Politics of the United Kingdom

Notes

References

Parliamentary constituencies in Cheshire
Constituencies of the Parliament of the United Kingdom established in 1983
Ellesmere Port